Khyber (خیبر درہ) may refer to:

Places
 Khyber Pass, a mountain pass that links Afghanistan and Pakistan
 Khyber District, a district of Khyber Pakhtunkhwa, Pakistan
 Khyber Pakhtunkhwa, a province of Pakistan
Khaybar, an oasis in Saudi Arabia
Khyber Rock, a suburb of Johannesburg, South Africa

People
Khyber Shah, Pakistani boxer
Mir Akbar Khyber, Afghan leftist

Other uses
Khyber train safari a tourist train in Pakistan
Khyber Pass Railway a railway line in Pakistan
Khyber Pass Economic Corridor an infrastructure and economic corridor between Afghanistan and Pakistan
Khyber, a character from Ben 10: Omniverse
The Khyber, a multipurpose arts centre in Halifax, Nova Scotia, Canada
Khyber Arts Society, which operates the Khyber Institute of Contemporary Art at the above arts centre
Khyber Mail (newspaper), a daily newspaper that used to be published from Peshawar in Khyber Pakhtunkhwa province of Pakistan
Khyber Mail (passenger train), a passenger train in Pakistan
Khyber Medical College
Khyber Afghan Airlines

See also
 Carry On Up the Khyber, a 1968 film in the Carry On series
 "Up the Khyber", a 1969 instrumental song by Pink Floyd
 Kyber (scheduler), a computing I/O scheduler
 Kyber crystal, fictional crystals in Star Wars
 Khaybar (disambiguation)